The Tao of Programming is a book written in 1987 by Geoffrey James. Written in a tongue-in-cheek style spoof of classic Taoist texts such as the Tao Te Ching and Zhuangzi which belies its serious message, it consists of a series of short anecdotes divided into nine "books":
 The Silent Void
 The Ancient Masters
 Design
 Coding
 Maintenance
 Management
 Corporate Wisdom
 Hardware and Software
 Epilogue

Geoffrey James wrote two other books on this theme, The Zen of Programming (978-0931137099) in 1988 and Computer Parables: Enlightenment in the Information Age (978-0931137136) in 1989.

See also
 Hacker koan

References

External links
 The Tao of Programming

Software development books
1987 non-fiction books
Computer humor
Satirical books
Taoism in popular culture